Jarred Gavan Gillett (born 1 November 1986) is an Australian football referee in the Premier League, following the announcement on 3 August 2021 that he had been promoted to the Select Group referees list.

Career
Gillett has refereed five Hyundai A-League Grand Finals (2012, 2015, 2016, 2017, 2018) and has been named the Hyundai A-League Referee of the Year on five occasions (2011–12, 2014–15, 2015–16, 2016–17 and 2017–18). 

He refereed the October 2009 National Youth League Grand Final. He was part of the Asian Football Confederation Project Future referees program and visited the Premier League in England in 2010 with the AFC. 

Gillett made his A-League debut during the 2010–11 A-League season, officiating in 15 matches, including the elimination semi-final between Adelaide United and Wellington Phoenix.

In April 2017, he was appointed as one of the inaugural video assistant referees (VARs) in the A-League (the first top-tier football league in the world to implement the technology). 

When Gillett was awarded the Hyundai A-League Referee of the Year award in 2016–17 for a record fourth time; this made him the most successful referee in A-League history. 

The 2018 A-League Grand Final between Newcastle Jets and Melbourne Victory was his fifth time, and fourth consecutive appearance, refereeing the Grand Final. In October 2018, Gillett refereed the 2018 FFA Cup Final between Adelaide United and Sydney FC. 

He has also officiated in the J-League (as part of an exchange program), the Indian Super League, the Chinese Super League and the Saudi Professional League and at the 2015 International Champions Cup. 

Gillett joined Select Group 2 in England at the start of the 2019–20 season after taking up a post-doctoral research position at Liverpool John Moores University.

On 15 April 2019, Gillett was selected to take charge of his first fixture in the EFL. He was chosen to officiate the EFL League Two match between Morecambe and Cheltenham Town on 22 April 2019. Gillett officiated his first Championship match, Blackburn Rovers v Swansea City, on the final day of the 2018–19 season. 

On 24 September 2019, he officiated an EFL Cup game. He refereed the match between Colchester United and Tottenham Hotspur.

Gillett also took charge of the second leg of the 2020–21 EFL Championship play-off semi-final between Brentford and AFC Bournemouth.

On 22 June 2021, Gillett was selected with three other referees to be promoted to the Select Group 1, allowing him to officiate Premier League games from the 2021–22 Premier League season onwards.

On 25 September 2021, he became the first person born outside of the British Isles to referee a Premier League game, taking charge of a 1–1 draw between Watford and Newcastle United.

Statistics

Australia

England

International

Notes

References 

1986 births
Living people
People from the Gold Coast, Queensland
A-League Men referees
Australian soccer referees
Australian expatriate sportspeople in England
Alumni of Liverpool John Moores University
Premier League referees